Günther Quandt (28 July 1881 – 30 December 1954) was a German industrialist who founded an industrial empire that today includes BMW and Altana, a car and chemical company, respectively. Between, 1921 and 1929 he was married to Magda Ritschel, later the wife of Nazi Propaganda Minister Joseph Goebbels. In the 1930s he joined the Nazi Party, becoming one of his strong financial supporters.

His descendants were ranked as the wealthiest Germans by Manager Magazin in 2014.

Early life 

He was born in Pritzwalk in Germany, the son of Emil Quandt (1849–1925). Emil had married in 1883 the daughter of a rich textile manufacturer (Reichswolle AG) and he took charge of the company in 1900. He had three siblings: Gerhard, Werner and a younger sister named Edith. Werner married Eleanor Quandt, who after the Second World War helped to protect her brother-in-law, Günther, from prosecution by the Allies. Günther's sister Edith married the owner of another textile company.

During World War I, with Günther in charge, the Quandts supplied the German army with uniforms, building up a larger fortune that Günther would use after the war to acquire Accumulatorenfabrik AG (AFA), a battery manufacturer in Hagen that would become VARTA, a potash-mining company, metal-working companies (including IWKA) and stakes in BMW and Daimler-Benz.

The Nazi period
After Adolf Hitler's appointment as Chancellor in 1933, Quandt joined the Nazi Party, becoming one of his strong financial supporters. In 1937, Hitler gave him the title of a Wehrwirtschaftsführer, (Leader in the Military Economy), like other industrialists who played a leading role in the war economy. Quandt's businesses supplied ammunition, rifles, artillery and batteries, using slave labourers from concentration camps in at least three factories. Tens of thousands of these labourers died or 80%. An execution area was set up in the grounds of AFA's Hanover factory. Quandt also appropriated factories throughout Europe after German invasions.

At the end of World War II, the US Senate held hearings on the operations of the German economy during the war. They found that Quandt was an important director in German industry, with a number of interlocking companies, syndicates and corporations. He had interest in such areas as insurance, banking, automobiles, ammunition, textiles, electricity, batteries and other areas. They also found out about his Wehrwirtschaftsführer title.

The Hanns-Joachim-Friedrichs-Award winning documentary film The Silence of the Quandts by the German public broadcaster ARD described in October 2007 the role of the Quandt family businesses during the Second World War. The family's political past was not well known, but the documentary film revealed this to a wide audience and confronted the Quandts about the use of slave labourers in the family's factories during World War II. As a result, five days after the showing, four family members announced, on behalf of the entire Quandt family, their intention to fund a research project in which a historian will examine the family's activities during Hitler's dictatorship. The independent 1,200-page study that was released in 2011 concluded: "The Quandts were linked inseparably with the crimes of the Nazis", stated by Joachim Scholtyseck, the Bonn historian who compiled and researched the study. , no compensation, apology or even memorial at the site of one of their factories have been permitted. BMW was not implicated in the report.

After the war
In 1946, Quandt was arrested because of the Goebbels connection, and interned. To the surprise of many, he was judged to be a Mitläufer (fellow traveller), namely someone who accepted the National Socialist ideology but did not take an active part in crimes. In January 1948, Quandt was released without charge.

One of the prosecutors in the Nuremberg trials, Benjamin Ferencz, now says that if today's evidence against Quandt had been presented to the court at the time, "Quandt would have been charged with the same offences as the directors of IG Farben." The directors served up to eight years in jail. Instead Quandt was able to re-install himself in the supervisory boards of various German firms, e.g. Deutsche Bank. He also became honorary citizen of the University in Frankfurt in 1951. He died on vacation in Cairo on 30 December 1954.

His two surviving sons, Herbert and Harald, administered their inheritance together, though Harald Quandt concentrated on the industrial plants Karlsruhe Augsburg AG (IWKA) which were involved in mechanical engineering and arms manufacture, while Herbert Quandt managed the investments in AFA/VARTA, Daimler-Benz and BMW.

Personal life
Günther Quandt first married Antonie 'Toni' Ewald. They had two sons Helmut Quandt (1908–1927) and Herbert Quandt. Antonie died of the Spanish flu in 1918 and Helmut died of complications from appendicitis in 1927.

His second marriage on 4 January 1921 in Bad Godesberg to Magda Ritschel produced another son, Harald Quandt. Magda was half Günther's age. The marriage ended in divorce in 1929. Two years later Magda married Joseph Goebbels with Adolf Hitler as best man.

See also
Herbert Quandt (1910–1982), son of Günther, regarded as having saved BMW 
Johanna Quandt (1926–2015), Herbert's wife
Stefan Quandt (born 1966), son of Herbert and Johanna
Susanne Klatten (born 1962), daughter of Herbert and Johanna
Silvia Quandt (born 1937), daughter of Herbert
Harald Quandt (1921–1967), son of Günther, a German industrialist

References

Further reading

German people of Dutch descent
1881 births
1954 deaths
People from Pritzwalk
Businesspeople from Brandenburg
German industrialists
20th-century German businesspeople
People from the Province of Brandenburg
Gunther
Nazi Party members